Franc Bogovič (born 2 February 1963) is a Slovenian politician who was first elected as a Member of the European Parliament in 2014 and re-elected in 2019. In addition to his committee assignments, he is part of the European Parliament Intergroup on Climate Change, Biodiversity and Sustainable Development.

References

1963 births
Living people
MEPs for Slovenia 2014–2019
MEPs for Slovenia 2019–2024
Agriculture ministers of Slovenia
Environment ministers of Slovenia